The Heat Is On may refer to:

 The Heat Is On (album), 1975 album from the Isley Brothers
 "The Heat Is On" (Agnetha Fältskog song), late 1970s/early 1980s hit for Noosha Fox and Agnetha Fältskog
 "The Heat Is On" (Glenn Frey song), a 1984 hit song for Glenn Frey from the Beverly Hills Cop soundtrack
 "The Heat Is On", a song by La Bouche from the album Sweet Dreams
 "The Heat Is On!", an episode of the television series On the Yorkshire Buses
 The Heat Is On, 1998 Ross Gelbspan book on global warming, including global warming denial

See also
The Heat's On, a 1943 American musical movie